Irina Vitalevna Baeva (Russian: Ирина Витальевна Баева; born October 25, 1992) is a Russian model and actress. She is most recognized for her portrayal of Daniela Montenegro, on the Las Estrellas drama telenovela Pasión y poder. Her second major role was in the drama Vino el amor.

Biography 
Baeva completed her primary and secondary education in Moscow, Russia. She studied Spanish, and learned to speak watching Mexican telenovelas. She also studied Journalism and Public Relations at Moscow State University, but left her studies to move to Mexico City.

Career 
In 2012, Baeva moved to Mexico City to study acting at the Centro de Educación Artística of Televisa. Her debut on the small screen was when she played "Katia" in the telenovela Muchacha italiana viene a casarse, where she shared credits with Livia Brito and José Ron, among others. In 2015, she was in the telenovela Pasión y poder, produced by José Alberto Castro, where she portrayed "Daniela", for which she received a nomination for the TVyNovelas Awards for Best Female Revelation. and gained wider fame in the Mexican television, mainly on telenovelas. The following year she was chosen as the protagonist in the telenovela Vino el amor, starring opposite Gabriel Soto. In 2018 she was host of the Mexican sports program "La Jugada del Mundial".

Television roles

References

External links 
 

1992 births
Living people
Russian television actresses
21st-century Russian actresses
Russian stage actresses
Russian expatriates in Mexico
Russian emigrants to Mexico